Simona-Iulia Matei (born 7 July 1985) is a former professional Romanian tennis player.

On 2 October 2006, she reached her career-high singles ranking of world No. 145 and her best WTA doubles ranking of 246. In her career, she won nine singles and seven doubles titles on tournaments of the ITF Circuit.

She was coached by Michele Tellini, and retired from pro tennis in 2010.

ITF Circuit finals

Singles: 15 (9 titles, 6 runner-ups)

Doubles: 15 (7 titles, 8 runner-ups)

External links
 
 
 

1985 births
Living people
Sportspeople from Brașov
Romanian female tennis players